Ellen Gable (born 5 May 1959) is an American author of Catholic fiction.

Life 
Gable, who publishes under her maiden name, was born in Camden, New Jersey and is a native of Philadelphia, Pennsylvania who moved to Arnprior, Ontario after marrying Canadian artist, musician and arts educator James Hrkach in 1982.

Her debut novel, Emily's Hope, won an Honorable Mention Award in Religious Fiction in the 2006 Independent Publisher Book Awards.  Her second novel, In Name Only, was released in 2009 and received the gold medal for Religious Fiction in the 2010 Independent Publisher Book Awards. In Name Only has been an Amazon Kindle #1 Bestseller.   Her third novel, Stealing Jenny, was published in 2011. It also reached #1 on Amazon Kindle's Religious & Liturgical Drama category in November 2011 and June/July, 2012.   Dancing on Friday, was published in 2013.

A Subtle Grace, was published in 2014. A sequel to In Name Only, it is set in 1896 in Philadelphia and tells of the romantic travails of the eldest daughter of a large, Catholic family.

Her newest novels are Julia's Gifts and Charlotte's Honor which are the first two books of the Great War Great Love series.  The third in the series, Ella's Promise, will be published in late 2019.  Some of her books are available in French, Portuguese, Spanish and Italian.

She is a freelance writer and has written for Family Foundations magazine, Ecclesia, Restoration and is a columnist for Amazing Catechists and Catholic Mom. She is also the former President of the Catholic Writers Guild.
 
She and her husband, James Hrkach, currently live in Pakenham, Ontario, Canada. They are the parents of five adult sons.

References

External links 
 Full Quiver Publishing
 http://ellengable.wordpress.com

1959 births
American Roman Catholic religious writers
Living people
American women novelists
Writers from Philadelphia
People from Lanark County
Writers from Ontario
American expatriates in Canada
21st-century American novelists
21st-century American women writers
20th-century American novelists
20th-century American women writers
Novelists from Pennsylvania
American women non-fiction writers
20th-century American non-fiction writers
21st-century American non-fiction writers